(born March 18, 1976) is a Japanese former professional baseball pitcher. He played for the Boston Red Sox (–), Montreal Expos / Washington Nationals (2001–), Milwaukee Brewers (2005–), Toronto Blue Jays, Cleveland Indians, as well as the Fukushima Hopes in Japan's Baseball Challenge League. He started his professional career with the Yokohama BayStars in Nippon Professional Baseball's Central League. He throws right-handed and is a switch hitter.

Coming to America
On November 20, 1998, Ohka's contract was purchased by the Boston Red Sox from the Yokohama BayStars (Japan's Central League). Ohka's statistics in Japan were less than flattering, but his ability to control his pitches sparked the interest of the Red Sox.

Early success
In 1999, Ohka began his North America professional career with the Red Sox' Double-A affiliate at that time, the Trenton Thunder. In 12 starts he went 8–0 with a 3.00 era. He was promoted to the Triple-A Pawtucket Red Sox where he had a 1.92 era and a 7–0 record. On July 19, 1999, he made his major league debut. With Pawtucket, he went 9–6 in 19 starts with a 2.96 era, with 3 complete games, one being a perfect game. In both 1999 and 2000, The Red Sox named Ohka their minor league player of the year. Ohka was in the All-Star Futures Game in 1999 and 2000 and in 2000 he was the Triple-A All-Star Game starting pitcher.

Major league career
Ohka became the first player from Japan to play for the Red Sox when he debuted in 1999. During the middle of the 2001 season, Ohka was sent to Montreal for the veteran closer Ugueth Urbina. Ohka had a mildly successful run with the Expos.

In June 2004, Ohka's right forearm was broken when he was hit by a line drive off the bat of Carlos Beltrán in Kansas City. Ohka underwent major surgery and was out until mid-September. He finished 3–7 with a 3.40 ERA in 15 starts.

Washington Nationals and Milwaukee Brewers

As the Expos moved to Washington, D.C. for the 2005 season, Ohka was part of a starting rotation that included Liván Hernández, Esteban Loaiza and Tony Armas Jr. Ohka was involved in an incident with Washington manager Frank Robinson. Ohka protested being removed from a game, a move which resulted in an undisclosed fine from the team. On June 10, 2005, the Washington Nationals traded Ohka to the Milwaukee Brewers for second baseman Junior Spivey. In Ohka's first game with his new club on June 14, he threw a shutout against the Tampa Bay Devil Rays during interleague play.

Toronto Blue Jays
On January 23, 2007, the right-hander reached a tentative agreement with the Toronto Blue Jays on a one-year contract. The agreement was made official on January 25, 2007, and the contract was announced to be worth $1,500,000. Ohka could earn an additional $1,500,000 in incentives. Incentives are usually based upon innings pitched or game appearances.

St. Louis Cardinals and Seattle Mariners
On June 7, after compiling a 2–5 record in 10 starts, the Toronto Blue Jays designated Ohka for assignment and subsequently released him on June 18. On June 19, 2007, he signed a minor league contract with the St. Louis Cardinals. He was released by the Cardinals on July 3, 2007, after going 0–2 with a 6.87 ERA in 3 starts for their Triple A team, the Memphis Redbirds. Ohka then signed a minor league contract on July 13, 2007, with the Seattle Mariners.

Ohka was released by Seattle on August 5, 2007, after going 0–3 with a 10.32 ERA in four outings, allowing 26 runs in  innings with the Tacoma Rainiers, Seattle's AAA affiliate.

Chicago White Sox
On February 21, 2008, Ohka signed a minor league contract with the Chicago White Sox, but did not play in the major leagues that year. He became a free agent at the end of the season.

In an eight-year career, Ohka has compiled a 48–57 record with 538 strikeouts and a 4.04 ERA in 943 innings.

On December 5, 2008, Ohka signed a minor league contract with the Cleveland Indians with an invitation to Spring Training. On March 15, he was reassigned to the minor league camp.  He was called up to the majors on May 30.

Return to Japan
On April 6, 2010, Ohka signed a contract with his former team, the Yokohama BayStars in Japan. He pitched for them through 2011.

In 2013, he reinvented himself as a knuckleball pitcher and played for the Toyama Thunderbirds of the Baseball Challenge League.

Toronto Blue Jays
Ohka signed a minor league contract with the Toronto Blue Jays on December 11, 2013. He was a non-roster invitee to spring training, but was reassigned to minor-league camp on March 2, 2014, without making an appearance. He was released by the Blue Jays at the end of spring training.

Bridgeport Bluefish
Ohka signed with the Bridgeport Bluefish of the independent Atlantic League of Professional Baseball for the 2014 season.

Fukushima Hope

Ohka returned to Japan and played with the Toyama Thunderbirds and Fukushima Hope of the semi-pro Baseball Challenge League for the 2015 season.

Baltimore Orioles 
On December 15, 2016, the Baltimore Orioles signed Ohka to a minor league contract. He was released on April 1, 2017, as the Orioles' spring training came to a close.

Milestone
Ohka pitched a nine-inning perfect game for the Triple-A Pawtucket Red Sox on June 1, 2000. Ohka retired all 27 batters he faced in a 2–0 win over the Charlotte Knights, and threw only 77 pitches to toss the first nine-inning perfect game in the International League since .

Pop culture
Ohka is the first and only member of the Montreal Expos to be named on The Simpsons. In the March 16, 2003, episode entitled "C. E. D'oh!," Bart Simpson exclaims "Look at me! I'm Tomokazu Ohka of the Montreal Expos!" while playing baseball, to which Milhouse replies "Well, I'm Esteban Yan of the Tampa Bay Devil Rays!", referencing the relative obscurity of the two pitchers and their respective teams.

References

External links

1976 births
Living people
Arizona League Brewers players
Boston Red Sox players
Brevard County Manatees players
Bridgeport Bluefish players
Charlotte Knights players
Columbus Clippers players
Cleveland Indians players
Japanese baseball coaches
Japanese expatriate baseball players in Canada
Japanese expatriate baseball players in the United States
Major League Baseball pitchers
Major League Baseball players from Japan
Memphis Redbirds players
Milwaukee Brewers players
Montreal Expos players
Nippon Professional Baseball coaches
Nippon Professional Baseball pitchers
Pawtucket Red Sox players
Baseball people from Kyoto
Tacoma Rainiers players
Toronto Blue Jays players
Trenton Thunder players
Washington Nationals players
Yokohama BayStars players